Santesteban is a surname of Basque origin. People with that name include:

 Ane Santesteban (born 1990), Spanish racing cyclist
 Jesús de Santesteban (1866 — after 1893), Basque pianist and composer, son of José Antonio
 Jose Agerre Santesteban (1889–1962), Basque writer and politician
 José Antonio Santesteban (1835–1906), Basque composer, song of José Juan, father of Jesús
 José Juan Santesteban (1809–1884), Basque composer, father of José Antonio

See also
 Doneztebe-Santesteban, a town in Navarre, Spain
 Saint-Esteben
 Santisteban
 

Surnames of Basque origin